Ryan D. Wilcox is an American politician who serves as a Representative in the Utah House of Representatives for District 7. Recently re-elected to the position in 2021, he previously held the same seat from 2009 to 2015.

Political career
Wilcox has supported 2nd amendment protections cosponsoring HB 357, which strengthens Second Amendment rights regardless of conceal-carry status. He also sponsored HB 134, which helps facilitate the transfer of firearms that have federally mandated requirements to be transferred. Additionally, Wilcox has worked to protect 4th amendment rights sponsoring HB 128 which protects personal electronic devices from searches without a proper warrant. Wilcox is also an advocate for knife rights, sponsoring HB 271  which restricts political subdivisions from issuing knife restrictions unless specifically authorized to do so. He has also received a great deal of press coverage for the opinion that certain changes need to be made to the Utah alcohol laws. He has run legislation that required improvements on the availability of reports brought from the Alcohol Abuse Tracking Committee to legislators so that it might be used more effectively.

During 2014, Wilcox served as Chair of the House Revenue and Taxation Committee and on the Business, Economic Development, and Labor Appropriations Subcommittee, The Commission on Federalism, The House Natural Resources and Environment Committee, and the Utah Tax Review Commission as well as several interim committees.

In national politics Representative Wilcox has continuously supported the ratification of the Comprehensive Nuclear-Test-Ban Treaty working with the congressional delegation from Utah and traveling to Washington to lobby for the effort.

Family and personal life
Wilcox was born and raised in Ogden, Utah and is a lifetime resident of Weber County. In 1999, married Kristina Beckstrom, in the Latter-day Saint Bountiful Utah Temple. He is the father of five children.

Wilcox graduated from Weber State University with a BA in Commercial Spanish and Political Science. For the past decade, Wilcox has worked for Sprint Nextel Corporation managing retail stores. Under his leadership, stores have won several awards for sales performance and operational excellence.

2014 Sponsored Legislation

Representative Wilcox also floor sponsored several bills: SB 19, SB 47, SB 63, SB 65, SB 123, SB 137, SB 155, SB 158, SB 199, SB 206, SB 207, SB 208, SB 214, SJR 9, and SJR 18.

External links
Representative Ryan D. Wilcox (official House site)
Vote Ryan Wilcox for District 7 (official campaign site)

References

Living people
Republican Party members of the Utah House of Representatives
Weber State University alumni
American businesspeople
American Latter Day Saints
American Mormon missionaries in the United States
20th-century Mormon missionaries
21st-century American politicians
Year of birth missing (living people)